Malcolm Lang (February 25, 1875 – February 24, 1941) was a Canadian politician, prospector and contractor.

He was born in Eagle, Elgin County, Ontario. Lang was first elected to the Ontario legislature in the 1914 provincial election as the Ontario Liberal Party Member of the Legislative Assembly for Cochrane. He was re-elected in 1919 and 1923. While still a Liberal MLA, Lang attempted to move to federal politics in 1925 as a Labour candidate in Timiskaming South. According to the House of Commons website, Lang faced off against another Labour candidate as well as the successful Conservative candidate. He was elected to the House of Commons of Canada on his next attempt, in the 1926 federal election in a straight contest against the Conservative incumbent and with the unofficial support of the Liberals who did not stand a candidate. Though a Labour MP, Lang generally supported the federal Liberal government of William Lyon Mackenzie King and ran for re-election in the 1930 federal election as a Liberal-Labour candidate, with the full backing of the Liberal party, but was unsuccessful.

External links 

1875 births
1941 deaths
Labour MPs in Canada
Liberal-Labour (Canada) MPs
Members of the House of Commons of Canada from Ontario
Ontario Liberal Party MPPs